Francesc is a masculine given name of Catalan origin. It is a cognate of Francis, Francesco, Francisco, François, and Franz. People with the name include:

Cesc Fàbregas (Francesc Fàbregas i Soler) (born 1987), Spanish professional football player
Francesc Antoni de la Dueña y Cisneros (1753–1821), Roman Catholic prelate; Bishop of Urgell 1797–1816
Francesc Areny Casal (contemporary), Andorran politician
Francesc Arnau (1975–2021), Spanish professional football player
Francesc Bellmunt (born 1947), Spanish screenwriter and film director
Francesc Berenguer i Mestres (1866–1914), Spanish Art Nouveau architect
Francesc Cambó (1876–1947), Spanish politician, government minister, and artistic supporter
Francesc Candel Tortajada (a.k.a. Paco Candel) (1925–2007), Spanish writer and journalist
Francesc Capdevila (born 1956), Spanish artist and illustrator
Francesc de Tamarit (1600–1653), Spanish politician and military leader during the Catalan Revolt
Francesc Eiximenis (c. 1340–1409), Spanish Franciscan priest, encyclopedist, and writer
Francesc Ferrer i Guàrdia (1859–1909), Spanish Catalan free-thinker and anarchist
Francesc Fontanella (1622–1685), Spanish poet, dramatist, and priest
Francesc Gaset Fris (born 1947), Andorran sport shooter
Francesc Layret (1880–1920), Spanish nationalist, politician, and lawyer; assassinated
Francesc Macià (1859–1933), Spanish military officer and president of Catalonia
Francesc Pi i Margall (Francisco Pi y Margall), Second President of the First Spanish Republic and Catalan romanticist writer
Francesc Pujols (1882–1962), Spanish writer and philosopher
Francesc Sabaté Llopart (1915–1960), Spanish anarchist; fought against the regime of Francisco Franco
Francesc Santacruz i Artigas (fl. 1665–1721), Spanish sculptor
Francesc Vicent Garcia (1582–1623), Spanish poet
Francesc Vicent (1450–1512), Spanish author who wrote about chess
Francesc Vilanova (1968–2014), Spanish professional football player and manager
Francesc Xavier Butinyà i Hospital (1834–1899), Spanish missionary Jesuit, teacher, and writer
François Arago (Francesc Joan Domènec Aragó) (1786–1853), French mathematician, physicist, astronomer, and politician
Xesco Espar (Francesc Espar Moya) (born 1963), Spanish handball player and trainer

Catalan masculine given names